The Songjiang Mosque, formerly called the Real Religion Mosque, is a mosque in Songjiang District, Shanghai, China. It is the oldest mosque in Shanghai.

History
The mosque was originally constructed during the Toghon Temür reign of the Yuan dynasty. It was rebuilt in 1391 and expanded three times during the Ming dynasty. The mosque then went through four renovations during the Qing dynasty. On 26 August 1908, the Shanghai municipal government listed the mosque as a cultural heritage. The mosque underwent renovation again in 1985.

Architecture

The mosque covers an area of 4,900 m2. It was constructed in traditional Hui Muslim Chinese palace architecture with Arabic calligraphy. The mosque consists of the mail hall, prayer niche, corridor, two sermon halls and a bathroom. In the east of the mosque lies the Bunker Gate Tower for Muslims to do prayer. The prayer hall is located in the opposite of the tower in the west of the mosque. It is divided into the front and the back hall, with characteristics of Ming and Yuan architecture respectively.

Transportation
The mosque is accessible within walking distance north of Zuibaichi Park station of Shanghai Metro.

See also
 Islam in China
 List of mosques in China

References

14th-century mosques
Ming dynasty architecture
Mosques in Shanghai
Mosques completed in 1391